Leland G. Heinrich (born July 29, 1943) is an American politician who served as a member of the Idaho State Senate from 2006 to 2010.

Early life and education 
On July 29, 1943, Heinrich was born in Boise, Idaho.

In 1965, Heinrich earned a Bachelor of Science degree in Agricultural Economics from the University of Idaho.

Career 
On November 7, 2006, Heinrich won the election and became a Republican member of Idaho Senate for District 8. Heinrich defeated Scott McLeod with 51.55% of the votes. On November 4, 2008, as an incumbent, Heinrich won the election and continued serving District 8. Heinrich defeated Randy K. Doman with 61.7% of the votes. On May 25, 2010, as an incumbent, Heinrich lost the election in the Republican Primary Election. Heinrich was defeated by Sheryl L. Nuxoll with 56.9% of the votes.

Personal life 
Heinrich's wife is Brenda Heinrich. They have five children.

References

External links 
 Leland Heinrich at ballotpedia.org

1943 births
Idaho state senators
University of Idaho alumni
Living people
People from Boise, Idaho